The Grey Glove is a 1928 Australian silent film based on a newspaper serial by E. V. Timms.

Synopsis
An amateur detective, John Courtney, tries to catch a mysterious criminal who always leaves a grey glove behind. Together with his fiancée Margaret he uncovers the work of a foreign spy.

Cast
Aubrey Kelner as John Courtney
Val Lassau as Margaret Trent
Phyllis Wheldon as Pauline Hemingway
Charles O'Mara as Inspector Drew
William Thornton as Charlie James
Claude Turton as Simpson
George Ames as Peterson
Carl Francis as Seton Carr
James Alexander as Perry

Production
The film was shot at Australasian's Bondi studios. It appears to have been shot prior to August 1926.

References

External links

The Grey Glove at National Film and Sound Archive
The Grey Glove novel at AustLit
Story serialised in 1925 – 18 April, 25 April, 2 May, 9 May, 16 May, 23 May, 30 May, 6 June, 13 June, 20 June, 27 June, 11 July, 18 July, 25 July, 1 Aug, 8 Aug, 15 Aug, 22 Aug, 

1928 films
Australian drama films
Australian silent feature films
Australian black-and-white films
1928 drama films
Films from Australasian Films
Films directed by Dunstan Webb
Silent drama films